Rama Parashurama is a 1980 Indian Kannada-language film, directed by Vijay and produced by Smt Gowramma Somashekar and Smt Dhanalakshmi Vijay. The film stars Vishnuvardhan, Srinath, Manjula and Thoogudeepa Srinivas. The film has musical score by Rajan–Nagendra.

Cast

Vishnuvardhan
Srinath
Manjula
Thoogudeepa Srinivas
Dinesh
Shakti Prasad
Prasad
Rajanand
Ramakrishna
Comedian Guggu
Adavani Lakshmidevi
Lakshmishree
Lalithamma
Shanthamma
Sripramila
Roopashree
Master Rajesh
Master Arun
Baby Rekha
Mallesh
Bhatti Mahadev
Shivaprakash
Sharapanjara Iyengar
Thipatur Siddaramaiah
Police Mahadev
Kunigal Ramanath
Tiger Prabhakar

Soundtrack
The music was composed by Rajan–Nagendra.

References

External links
 
 

1980 films
1980s Kannada-language films
Films scored by Rajan–Nagendra
Films directed by Vijay (director)